The U.S. Army Research Institute of Environmental Medicine (USARIEM) is the U.S Army’s main institution and facility for military environmental medicine and exercise physiology research. It is located at Natick, Massachusetts, within the U.S. Army Soldier Systems Center (SSC) installation, but is a subordinate lab of the U.S. Army Medical Research and Materiel Command (USAMRMC), headquartered at Fort Detrick, Maryland, USA.

Mission

USARIEM’s Mission Statement mandates that the Institute:

The Institute has four divisions, each relating to military human performance as it relates to the environment — Biophysical and Biomedical Modeling, Military Nutrition, Military Performance, and Thermal and Mountain Medicine. Research in the divisions focuses on three elements: the servicemember (acclimation; body size; gender; race; age; health; hydration; nutrition; fitness; and sleep status), the environment (temperature; wind; humidity; and altitude), and the mission (work — intensity, duration, and type; clothing and equipment; and medications).

Research on the effect of environmental pollutants on military personnel is not part of USARIEM's mission, but is within the purview of the U.S. Army Center for Environmental Health Research at Fort Detrick, Maryland.

History

USARIEM traces its institutional lineage back to 1927 and the Harvard Fatigue Laboratory. That facility fostered two institutions that ultimately merged. The first was the Climatic Research Laboratory in Lawrence, MA (1943–54), which relocated to Natick in 1954 under the new name of the Environmental Protection Research Division (EPRD) of the U.S. Army’s Quartermaster Research and Engineering Command. The second was the Armored Medical Research Laboratory (AMRL) at Fort Knox, KY (1942–61) elements of which joined with the EPRD in 1961 to constitute the present USARIEM facility and organization.

Products and capabilities
USARIEM’s basic and applied research capabilities are focused upon biomedical evaluations, health hazard assessments, countermeasures development and a rapid response to a diverse range of environmental threats and problems. Products include individual soldier equipment and rations; guidelines pertaining to training policy and preventive medicine; and performance monitoring strategies and predictive algorithms.

Research Divisions

Research divisions within USARIEM consist of Biophysics and Biomedical Modeling (which develops wearable biosensors and biomedical models to simulate effects of heat, cold, high altitude, hydration, nutritional status and clothing systems and equipment)[], Military Performance (which researches performance enhancements [physical, cognitive, behavioral, psychomotor] in military occupational tasks), Military Nutrition (which researches nutritional issues, including new rations, affecting service members), and Thermal and Mountain Medicine (which researches physical and cognitive work capabilities and medical problems associated with military operations at high terrestrial altitude or temperature extremes).

Facilities

USARIEM maintains several unique or highly specialized facilities:

 Hypobaric Chamber Facility or HCF (altitude chambers)
 Two Class D chambers (man-rated) rarefied air atmosphere, non-oxygen enriched
 Large Study Chamber: internal volume of 2000 cu. ft. (floor area 200 sq. ft.) 
 Small Study Chamber: internal volume of 1100 cu. ft. (floor area 108 sq. ft.)
 Environmentally controlled (altitude, temperature, humidity) & connected by an airlock
 Simulates altitudes of 800-225 Torr (sea level to 9000 m) 
 Temperatures from -32 °C to 43 °C
 Relative humidity (Rh) between 20-80% (dew point dependent) 
 23,656 simulated altitude exposures of human volunteers over 33 years of studies
 13 Environmental Chambers 
 Temperatures from -10 °C to 50 °C
 5 Biophysical Evaluation Chambers 
 Temperatures from -10 °C to 50 °C
 Biomechanics Laboratory
 Water Immersion Laboratory
 Temperatures from 5 °C to 45 °C
 Human Exercise Physiology Laboratory
 Human/Animal Physiology Laboratory
 Psychology Laboratory
 Electron Microscopy Laboratory
 Animal Housing and Care Facility 
 Association for Assessment and Accreditation of Laboratory Animal Care International (AAALAC) Accredited
 Doriot Climatic Chamber Complex 
 Temperatures from -57 °C to 74 °C
 Laser and Flow Cytometry

Off site:
 United States Army Pike’s Peak Research Laboratory
Located in Colorado at 4,300 m

List of USARIEM commanders

See also
 History of military nutrition in the United States

References

This article contains information that originally came from US Government publications and websites and is in the public domain.

External links
Official USARIEM Website

Environmental Medicine
Natick, Massachusetts
Medical and health organizations based in Massachusetts